Oscar Alberto Ortiz (born 8 April 1953 in Chacabuco, Buenos Aires) is a retired Argentine footballer who played as a winger.

Career
The most notable achievement of his footballing career was being part of the Argentina team that won the World Cup 1978.

Ortiz began his career at San Lorenzo, as a young player he was part of the squad that won 3 league titles (M1972, N1972 and N1974).

In 1976 San Lorenzo sold him to Brazilian club Grêmio, but his stay there didn't last long, he returned to Argentina to play for River Plate.

His time at River Plate was his most successful, in terms of trophies. his first trophy at the club was the Metropolitano championship in 1977.

His fine form saw him called up to play for Argentina in World Cup 1978, he was a member of the team that defeated the Netherlands 3–1 in the final (held in River's home stadium Estadio Monumental) to claim Argentina's first World Cup.

Back at River Ortiz helped River to win 3 league titles in a row (M1979, N1979 and M1980), the second time in their history that they had achieved this feat.

In 1981 River sold Ortiz to Club Atlético Huracán, his time there was unremarkable and he was soon sold on to Independiente.

The last title he won came at Independiente as part of the triumphant 1983 Motropolitano team, he retired from football shortly afterwards.

Player statistics
 Argentina (1975–1979): Games 23 Goals 3
 Argentine Primera (1971–1976 / 1977–1983): Games 317 Goals 32

Honours

Club
San Lorenzo
 Metropolitano: 1972
 Nacional: 1972, 1974

River Plate
 Metropolitano: 1977, 1979, 1980
 Nacional: 1979

Independiente
 Metropolitano: 1983

International
Argentina
 FIFA World Cup: 1978

References

External links
 
 
 Oscar Ortiz at San Lorenzo Jugadores 

1953 births
Living people
Argentine footballers
San Lorenzo de Almagro footballers
Club Atlético River Plate footballers
Club Atlético Huracán footballers
Club Atlético Independiente footballers
Argentine Primera División players
FIFA World Cup-winning players
1978 FIFA World Cup players
Sportspeople from Buenos Aires Province
Argentina international footballers
Association football wingers